Edward Otto McIvor   (1884–1954) was an outfielder in Major League Baseball for the 1911 St. Louis Cardinals. He was a sixteen-year player in the minor leagues between 1904 and 1920, but only managed to get into 30 games during the 1911 season. McIvor pitched in the minor leagues in 1904, going 3–1. Despite that, he stayed with being an outfielder. He made his major league debut on April 11, 1911 and played his final game September 22 of the same year. During those 30 games, McIvor hit .226/.333/.339 with one home run (an inside the parker hit 7/19/11 off of Bill Schardt) and 9 RBIs in 72 Plate appearances. He later managed in the minor leagues for the 1913 Austin Senators, 1916 Fort Worth Panthers, 1924 Waco Indians, 1924 Austin Rangers and 1925 Terrell Terrors.

Sources

Baseball players from Texas
1884 births
1954 deaths
Major League Baseball outfielders
St. Louis Cardinals players
Minor league baseball managers
Dallas Giants players
Corsicana Oilers players
Temple Boll Weevils players
Greenville Hunters players
Shreveport Pirates (baseball) players
Mobile Sea Gulls players
San Antonio Bronchos players
Austin Senators players
San Francisco Seals (baseball) players
Fort Worth Panthers players
Shreveport Gassers players
Sacramento Senators players
Sherman Twins players
Terrell Terrors players
Waco Indians players
Austin Rangers players